Kanding railway station is a railway station located in Kanding Township, Pingtung, Taiwan. It is located on the Pingtung line and is operated by Taiwan Railways.

References

1952 establishments in Taiwan
Railway stations opened in 1952
Railway stations in Pingtung County
Railway stations served by Taiwan Railways Administration